Zhang Tian (born September 30, 1980 in Inner Mongolia) is a Chinese sport shooter. He won a silver medal in the men's free pistol at the 2012 ISSF World Cup series in Milan, Italy, with a total score of 664.6 points, earning him a spot on the Chinese team for the Olympics.

Zhang represented China at the 2012 Summer Olympics in London, where he competed in the men's 50 m pistol, along with his teammate Wang Zhiwei who eventually won the bronze medal in the final. Zhang scored a total of 553 points in the qualifying rounds, two inner tens behind Italy's Francesco Bruno, finishing in twenty-fifth place.

References

External links
NBC Olympics Profile

1980 births
Living people
Chinese male sport shooters
Olympic shooters of China
Shooters at the 2012 Summer Olympics
Sport shooters from Inner Mongolia
Shooters at the 2006 Asian Games
People from Alxa League
Asian Games competitors for China
21st-century Chinese people